Unbeatable may refer to:

 Unbeatable (film), a 2013 Hong Kong–Chinese film by Dante Lam
 Unbeatable, a British quiz show presented by Jason Manford
 Unbeatable, a 2011 Chinese TV series starring Hu Ge
 Unbeatable strategy, proposed by W.D. Hamilton in his 1967 paper on sex ratios

See also
 The Unbeatables, a 1993/1996/2002 Chinese drama serial
 The Unbeatables (film), or Underdogs, a 2013 Argentine film